Caravelas is a city of about 20,000 inhabitants in southern Bahia, Brazil, a few miles above the mouth of the Caravelas River.

Caravelas was founded in 1581 by Portuguese settlers. It was once the centre of a flourishing whale fishery. It is the port of the Bahia & Minas railway pt. Caravelas is the nearest town to the uninhabited Abrolhos Archipelago. 
The city contains part of the Cassurubá Extractive Reserve, a  sustainable use conservation unit that protects an area of mangroves, river and sea where shellfish are harvested.

The city is served by Caravelas Airport.

See also
 Abrolhos Marine National Park

References

Populated coastal places in Bahia
Populated places established in 1503
Municipalities in Bahia